Philippe Fauveau (born 7 June 1926) is a French former rower. He competed in the men's eight event at the 1948 Summer Olympics.

References

1926 births
Living people
French male rowers
Olympic rowers of France
Rowers at the 1948 Summer Olympics
Place of birth missing (living people)